Croissy-Beaubourg is a French commune located in the Seine-et-Marne département, in the Île-de-France région.

Geography 
The village is located 3 km in the South of Torcy. It's around 1 163 ha amongst which 600 are from forests.

Hydrography 
There is one river in the village, the channel No. 1 on the village of Pontcarré (2.2 km length) which merge with the Morbras. It passes on Croissy-Beaubourg on a distance of 0.02 km.

There are several ponds in the village among which two older stanks, the Croissy one and the Beaubourg one. They were probably created during 17th century for the castle. It's here that starts the Maubuée, a Marne's affluent.

Communication and transport 
There are two different lines of bus in the village: 321, 421. The A4 Motorway passes on the North, with an interchange (10.1 Val Maubué Sud) in the village.

There are also 4 district roads, the D406, D1406, D10P and D128.

Demographics
Inhabitants of Croissy-Beaubourg are called Croisséens.

At the census of 1999, the town had a population of 2,236.

Education
There are two public schools in the commune, École maternelle Alfred Chartier (preschool) and École élémentaire Les Lions de Beaubourg (elementary school).

Collège du Segrais (public junior high school) is in nearby Lognes. Lycée Jean Moulin (public senior high school/sixth-form college) is in nearby Torcy. Additional public senior highs/sixth-forms include Lycée Maurice Rondeau in Bussy-St-Georges and Lycée polyvalent René Cassin in Noisiel.

There are two private schools in nearby Lagny-sur-Marne, École Saint Joseph de Cluny (preschool and elementary school) and Ensemble scolaire Saint Laurent et La Paix Notre Dame.

University of Marne-la-Vallée provides university education in the area.

See also
Communes of the Seine-et-Marne department

References

External links

Home page 
1999 Land Use, from IAURIF (Institute for Urban Planning and Development of the Paris-Île-de-France région) 
 

Communes of Seine-et-Marne
Val Maubuée